The Sargasso Sea is a region of the Atlantic Ocean bounded by four currents forming an ocean gyre. Unlike all other regions called seas, it has no land boundaries. It is distinguished from other parts of the Atlantic Ocean by its characteristic brown Sargassum seaweed and often calm blue water.

The sea is bounded on the west by the Gulf Stream, on the north by the North Atlantic Current, on the east by the Canary Current, and on the south by the North Atlantic Equatorial Current, the four together forming a clockwise-circulating system of ocean currents termed the North Atlantic Gyre. Bermuda is near the western fringes of the sea.

While all of the above currents deposit marine plants and refuse into the sea, ocean water in the Sargasso Sea is distinctive for its deep blue color and exceptional clarity, with underwater visibility of up to 61 m (200 ft). It is also a body of water that has captured the public imagination, and so is seen in a wide variety of literary and artistic works and in popular culture.

History
The first known written account of the Sargasso Sea dates to Christopher Columbus in 1492, who wrote about seaweed that he feared would trap his ship and potentially hide shallow waters that could run them aground, as well as a lack of wind that he feared would trap them.

The sea may have been known to earlier mariners, as a poem by the late fourth century author Avienius describes a portion of the Atlantic as being covered with seaweed and windless, citing a now-lost account by the fifth century BC Carthaginian Himilco the Navigator. Columbus himself was aware of this account and thought Himilco had reached the Sargasso Sea, as did several other explorers. However, modern scholars consider this unlikely. According to the Muslim cartographer Muhammad al-Idrisi, the Mugharrarūn ("the adventurers") sent by the Almoravid sultan Ali ibn Yusuf (1084–1143), led by his admiral Ahmad ibn Umar, reached a part of the ocean covered by seaweed, identified by some as the Sargasso Sea.

In 1609, the English vessel Sea Venture was blown to the shore of Bermuda. The sea has also been the site of whaling and fishing.

The 1920–1922 Dana expeditions, led by Johannes Schmidt, determined that the European eel's breeding sites were in the Sargasso Sea. The sea has played a role in a number of other pioneering research efforts, including William Beebe and Otis Barton's 1932 dive where they conducted observations of animals and radio broadcasts, John Swallow's work on the Swallow float in the late 1950s, the discovery of Prochlorococcus by a team of researchers in the 1980s, and various oceanographic data gathering programs such as those of Henry Stommel.

In July 1969, British businessman and amateur sailor Donald Crowhurst disappeared after his yacht became mired in the Sargasso Sea. He had been competing in the Sunday Times Golden Globe Race, a single-handed, round-the-world yacht race when his poorly-prepared boat began to take on water. He abandoned his circumnavigation attempt, but reported false positions by radio in an attempt to give the impression that he was still participating. Eventually, Crowhurst wound up drifting in the Sargasso Sea, where he deteriorated psychologically, filling his logbooks with metaphysical speculation and delusional comments. His last entry was July 1, and his yacht was found unoccupied and drifting on July 10. It is unclear whether his death came as the result of suicide or misadventure.

Boundaries 
The sea is bounded on the west by the Gulf Stream, on the north by the North Atlantic Current, on the east by the Canary Current, and on the south by the North Atlantic Equatorial Current, the four together forming a clockwise-circulating system of ocean currents termed the North Atlantic Gyre. Bermuda is near the western fringes of the sea.

Because the Sargasso Sea is bordered by oceanic currents, its precise borders may change. The Canary Current in particular is widely variable, and often the line utilized is one west of the Mid-Atlantic Ridge.

Ecology

The Sargasso Sea is home to seaweed of the genus Sargassum, which floats en masse on the surface. The Great Atlantic Sargassum Belt is the largest such mass in the world. The sargassum masses generally are not a threat to shipping, and historic incidents of sailing ships being trapped there are due to the often calm winds of the horse latitudes. 

The Sargasso Sea plays a role in the migration of catadromous eel species such as the European eel, the American eel, and the American conger eel. The larvae of these species hatch within the sea, and as they grow they travel to Europe or the East Coast of North America. Later in life, the matured eel migrates back to the Sargasso Sea to spawn and lay eggs. It is also believed that after hatching, young loggerhead sea turtles use currents such as the Gulf Stream to travel to the Sargasso Sea, where they use the sargassum as cover from predators until they are mature. The sargassum fish is a species of frogfish specially adapted to blend in among the sargassum seaweed.

In the early 2000s, the Sargasso Sea was sampled as part of the Global Ocean Sampling survey, to evaluate its diversity of microbial life through metagenomics. Contrary to previous theories, results indicated the area has a wide variety of prokaryotic life.

Threats

Pollution
Owing to surface currents, the Sargasso accumulates a high concentration of non-biodegradable plastic waste. The area contains the huge North Atlantic garbage patch.

Several nations and nongovernmental organizations have united to protect the Sargasso Sea. These organizations include the Sargasso Sea Commission
established 11 March 2014 by the governments of the Azores (Portugal), Bermuda (United Kingdom), Monaco, the United Kingdom and the United States.

Bacteria that consume plastic have been found in the plastic-polluted waters of the Sargasso Sea; however, it is unknown whether these bacteria ultimately clean up poisons or simply spread them elsewhere in the marine microbial ecosystem. Plastic debris can absorb toxic chemicals from ocean pollution, potentially poisoning anything that eats it.

Others 
Human activity in the Sargasso Sea has negatively impacted it, such as over-fishing and shipping.

Depictions in popular culture
The Sargasso Sea is often portrayed in literature and the media as an area of mystery. It is often depicted in fiction as a dangerous area where ships are mired in weed for centuries, unable to escape.

Literature 
Ezra Pound's  opens with the line: "Your mind and you are our Sargasso Sea", suggesting that the woman addressed in the poem is a repository of trivia and disconnected facts.

The Sargasso Sea features in classic fantasy stories by William Hope Hodgson, such as his novel The Boats of the "Glen Carrig" (1907), Victor Appleton's Don Sturdy novel Don Sturdy in the Port of Lost Ships: Or, Adrift in the Sargasso Sea, and several related short stories. Jules Verne's Twenty Thousand Leagues Under the Seas describes the Sargasso Sea and gives an account of its formation. Thomas Allibone Janvier's 1898 novel is titled In the Sargasso Sea.

The Sargasso Sea is the setting of the eighth Doc Savage novel, The Sargasso Ogre. 

Wide Sargasso Sea (1966) by Jean Rhys is a rewriting of Charlotte Brontë's Jane Eyre from Bertha Mason's point of view.

Television 

The first episode of the television series Jonny Quest, "Mystery of the Lizard Men", involves nefarious activities of foreign agents and was set primarily in the Sargasso Sea.

In the episode "The Time Trap," from Star Trek: The Animated Series, an extra-dimensional space filled with lost ships is called a Sargasso Sea.

The in the third season of the TV series Black Sails, a tropical storm blows the ship Walrus of Captain Flint into the Sargasso Sea. The ship experiences a lack of wind for about two weeks.

Music 
 Guitarist Leo Kottke wrote and performed "Easter and the Sargasso Sea", released in 1970 on his album Circle Round the Sun.
 Guitarists John Abercrombie and Ralph Towner released an album titled Sargasso Sea in 1976.
 "Sargasso Sea" is the title of the sixth track of the 1972 album All on the First Day by Tony, Caro and John.
 The ninth song in Taeko Onuki's 1977 album Sunshower is titled "Sargasso Sea".
 Pram's third album is titled Sargasso Sea.
 The video for the 2007 song "Dashboard" by Modest Mouse features the Sargasso Sea on a map and as the purported scene of events depicted in the video.
 Electronic jam band Lotus (American band) released a live album in 2007 titled "Escaping Sargasso Sea".
2011: "Wide Sargasso Sea", song written by rock 'n' roll singer Stevie Nicks about the novel and film; it appears on her 2011 album In Your Dreams.
The “Super Sargasso Sea” is mentioned on the 2nd track of pop rock musical project Lemon Demon’s 2016 album Spirit Phone, “Touch-Tone Telephone.”
 "Sargasso Sea" is the title of the 8th track of the 2023 album Time's Arrow by Ladytron.

References 
Notes

Bibliography

External links

 
 Sargasso Sea Alliance
 
 Photos of organisms living in the Sargasso Sea

Bermuda Triangle
Seas of the Atlantic Ocean